Let's Spin! is the title of the debut album by rock band The Swirling Eddies, released in 1988 on Alarma Records.

Although the true identities of the Swirling Eddies were later revealed, it remained a complete mystery for most people at the time of this album's release. Frontline Records helped to launch the Swirling Eddies debut release with a "Guess the Eddies" contest. Fliers and magazine advertisements were distributed that included clues as to the identities of the Eddies. Contest participants were able to submit their own lists of who they thought the Eddies might be.

Track listing

Side one
 "Let's Spin!" - 4:12 (Words and music by Camarillo Eddy)
 "Catch That Angel" - 4:19 (Words and music by Camarillo Eddy)
 "The Unsuccessful Dutch Missionary" - 0:08 (Words and music by Camarillo Eddy)
 "The Big Guns" - 4:35 (Words and music by Camarillo Eddy)
 "Rodeo Drive" - 4:27 (Words and music by Camarillo Eddy)
 "Ed Takes a Vacation (A Suite)" - 5:50 (Words by Camarillo Eddy, Music by Camarillo Eddy, Gene Pool, Berger Roy Al)

Side two
 "Snowball" - 4:13 (Music by Camarillo Eddy, Gene Pool, Berger Roy Al, Hort Elvison)
 "I've Got an Idea" - 4:10 (Words and music by Camarillo Eddy)
 "Don't Ask Me How I Feel" - 6:27 (Words and music by Camarillo Eddy)
 "Ed Again" - 0:35 (Music by Camarillo Eddy)
 "What a World, What a World" - 5:05 (Words and music by Camarillo Eddy)

Personnel
 Camarillo Eddy on guitars and vocals.
 Gene Pool on lead guitars, keyboards.
 Arthur Fhardy on keyboards.
 Spot on guitars.
 Berger Roy Al on bass guitar.
 Hort Elvison on drums.

Additional musicians
 Jany Macklebee: backing vocal and speaks "Snowball".
 Buckeye Jazzbo: a horn.
 Horns performed by the Horns O' Plenty under the direction of Buckeye Jazzbo.

Production notes
 Engineered by Doug Doyle.
 Mixed by Camarillo Eddy and Doug Doyle.
 Recorded and Mixed at Asylomar Studios, Costa Mesa, California.
 Art Direction and Design by Jeb McSwaggart.

References

1988 debut albums
The Swirling Eddies albums